Bill or William Madden may refer to:

William Madden (piper) (fl. 1855–1857), Irish piper
William Madden (Medal of Honor) (1843–?), U.S. Navy Medal of Honor recipient
Billy Madden (1852–1918), American pugilist
William V. Madden (1868–1921), American architect
Bill Madden (footballer) (1881–1917), Australian rules footballer
Bill Madden (soldier) (1924–1951), Australian recipient of the George Cross in the Korean War
Bill Madden (sportswriter) (born 1946), American sportswriter
Bill Madden (musician), American singer-songwriter